Life Rays is the final album by vibraphonist Walt Dickerson which was recorded in Italy in 1982 for the Soul Note label.

Reception

AllMusic gave the album 3 stars.

The authors of the Penguin Guide to Jazz Recordings wrote: "In the dynamic company of Sirone and Cyrille, Walt emerges as a particular kind of modernist, a radical-conservative... Dickerson seems to be striking harder than usual, Cyrille is faultless and the music has a strongly percussive quality. Sirone is magnificent whenever soloing..."

Writing for Jazz Times, Duck Baker commented that Dickerson's "conception of melodic/percussive development is really his own. He may at times sound impressionistic, as when he creates such long shimmering lines that they cease to be heard as lines and become a sonic waterfall, but it’s not just a pretty thing." Regarding Sirone and Cyrille, he stated: "The context calls for the utmost in understatement and controlled passion, and even staunch fans of these two may be surprised at how well they answer the call."

Track listing
All compositions by Walt Dickerson except where noted.
 "No Ordinary Man" – 9:02
 "Good Relationship" – 13:37
 "Life Rays" – 4:42
 "It Ain't Necessarily So" (George Gershwin, Ira Gershwin) – 18:06

Personnel 
Walt Dickerson – vibraphone
Sirone – bass 
Andrew Cyrille – drums

References 

1982 albums
Walt Dickerson albums
Black Saint/Soul Note albums
Sirone (musician) albums
Andrew Cyrille albums